The 2017 season is Ansan Greeners FC's 1st season of existence. They will participate in the K League Challenge as well as the FA Cup.

Transfers

Winter

In:

Out:

Summer

In:

Out:

Squad

Competitions

K League Challenge

Results summary

Results by round

Results

League table

FA Cup

Squad statistics

Appearances and goals

|-
|colspan="14"|Players away from Ansan Greeners on loan:
|-
|colspan="14"|Players who left Ansan Greeners during the season:

|}

Goal scorers

Disciplinary record

References

External links 

Ansan Greeners FC seasons
2017 in South Korean football
South Korean football clubs 2017 season